Jean-Paul Moulinot (30 June 1912 – 3 December 1989) was a French actor, sociétaire of the Comédie-Française.

Elisabeth (Yvette) Hardy (1917-2000), a comedian at the TNP, was his wife. Close to Jean Vilar, he took part to the first Festival d'Avignon in 1947 and from 1951, the year the TNP reopened, he belonged to the troupe where he 
remained during all the years Jean Vilar was the director, then joined the Comédie-Française until his death.

Career at the Comédie-Française 
 Admission at the Comédie-Française in 1966
 Sociétaire in 1989
 481st sociétaire
1937: Business is business by Octave Mirbeau, directed by Fernand Ledoux
1938: Cyrano de Bergerac by Edmond Rostand, directed by Pierre Dux 
1966: Les Femmes savantes by Molière, directed by Jean Meyer 
1966: Le commissaire est bon enfant by Georges Courteline and Jules Lévy, directed by Robert Manuel
1967: Le Jeu de l'amour et du hasard by Marivaux, directed by Maurice Escande
1967: Le Malade imaginaire by Molière, directed by Robert Manuel
1967: La Commère by Marivaux, directed by Michel Duchaussoy 
1967: L'Émigré de Brisbane by Georges Schéhadé, directed by Jacques Mauclair
1967: L'Étourdi by Molière, directed by Jean-Paul Roussillon
1967: Le Médecin malgré lui by Molière, directed by Jean-Paul Roussillon    
1968: Le Joueur by Regnard, directed by Jean Piat
1968: Ruy Blas by Victor Hugo, directed by Raymond Rouleau  
1969: Les Italiens à Paris by Charles Charras and André Gille after Évariste Gherardi, directed by Jean Le Poulain
1969: Port-Royal by Henry de Montherlant, directed by Jean Meyer  
1970: Malatesta by Henry de Montherlant, directed by Pierre Dux 
1970: A Dream Play by August Strindberg, directed by Raymond Rouleau 
1971: Becket ou l'Honneur de Dieu by Jean Anouilh, directed by the author and Roland Piétri
1972: Cyrano de Bergerac by Edmond Rostand, directed by Jacques Charon
1972: Volpone by Jules Romains and Stefan Zweig, directed by Gérard Vergez, Comédie-Française at the Théâtre de l'Odéon
1972: Graf Öderland by Max Frisch, directed by Jean-Pierre Miquel, Comédie-Française at the Théâtre de l'Odéon
1972: La Station Champbaudet by Eugène Labiche and Marc-Michel, directed by Jean-Laurent Cochet
1973: Le Malade imaginaire by Molière, directed by Jean-Laurent Cochet
1973: Dom Juan by Molière, directed by Antoine Bourseiller
1973: Les Femmes savantes by Molière, directed by Jean Piat
1973: L'École des femmes by Molière, directed by Jean-Paul Roussillon
1974: Hernani by Victor Hugo, directed by Robert Hossein
1974: L'Impromptu de Marigny, by Jean Poiret, directed by Jacques Charon
1975: Dialogues with Leucò by Cesare Pavese, directed by Antoine Bourseiller, Comédie-Française at the Petit Odéon 
1976: Trafic by Louis Calaferte, directed by Jean-Pierre Miquel, Comédie-Française at the Petit Odéon
1976: Cyrano de Bergerac by Edmond Rostand, directed by Jean-Paul Roussillon
1976: Lorenzaccio by Alfred de Musset, directed by Franco Zeffirelli
1977: Doit-on le dire ? by Eugène Labiche, directed by Jean-Laurent Cochet
1978: A Flea In Her Ear by Eugène Labiche, directed by Jean-Laurent Cochet
1979: Ruy Blas by Victor Hugo, directed by Jacques Destoop 
1979: L'Œuf by Félicien Marceau, directed by Jacques Rosny
1980: Simul et singulis, Soirées littéraires consacrées au Tricentenaire de la Comédie-Française, directed by Simon Eine, Alain Pralon and Jacques Destoop 
1981: La Dame de chez Maxim by Georges Feydeau, directed by Jean-Paul Roussillon
1983: Triptychon by Max Frisch, directed by Roger Blin, Comédie-Française at the Théâtre de l'Odéon
1983: Amphitryon by Molière, directed by Philippe Adrien
1984: Ivanov by Tchekov, directed by Claude Régy
1986: The Liar by Corneille, directed by Alain Françon 
1986: Le Bourgeois Gentilhomme by Molière, directed by Jean-Luc Boutté
1986: The Liar by Corneille, directed by Alain Françon 
1987: La Manivelle by Robert Pinget, directed by Jean-Paul Roussillon, Comédie-Française at the Festival d'Avignon
1988: Endgame by Samuel Beckett, directed by Gildas Bourdet

Outside the Comédie-Française 
1945: Tartuffe by Molière, directed by Marcel Herrand, Théâtre des Mathurins
1946: Primavera by Claude Spaak, directed by Marcel Herrand, Théâtre des Mathurins 
1947: Je vivrai un grand amour by Steve Passeur, Théâtre des Mathurins
1949: Le Légataire universel by Jean-François Regnard, directed by Georges Douking, Théâtre des Célestins
1949: Héloïse et Abélard by Roger Vailland, directed by Jean Marchat, Théâtre des Mathurins 
1950: Henry IV by Luigi Pirandello, directed by André Barsacq, Théâtre de l'Atelier
1951: Mother Courage by Bertolt Brecht, directed by Jean Vilar, TNP Théâtre de la Cité Jardins Suresnes
1952: The Miser by Molière, directed by Jean Vilar, TNP Théâtre national de Chaillot, Festival d'Avignon 
1952: Lorenzaccio by Alfred de Musset, directed by Gérard Philipe, TNP Festival d'Avignon 
1956: Les Femmes savantes by Molière, directed by Jean-Paul Moulinot, TNP Théâtre de Chaillot
1956: Le Mariage de Figaro by Beaumarchais, directed by Jean Vilar, TNP Festival d'Avignon
1956: Platonov by Anton Tchekov, directed by Jean Vilar, Festival de Bordeaux, TNP
1957: Le Mariage de Figaro by Beaumarchais, directed by Jean Vilar, TNP Festival d'Avignon
1957: Henry IV by Luigi Pirandello, directed by Jean Vilar, TNP Festival d'Avignon, Théâtre de Chaillot 
1957: Murder in the Cathedral by Thomas Stearns Eliot, directed by Jean Vilar, TNP Festival d'Avignon
1958: Ubu roi by Alfred Jarry, directed by Jean Vilar, TNP Théâtre de Chaillot
1958: Œdipe by André Gide, directed by Jean Vilar, TNP, Festival de Bordeaux, Festival d'Avignon 
1958: L'École des femmes by Molière, directed by Georges Wilson, TNP Théâtre de Chaillot
1958: Lorenzaccio by Alfred de Musset, directed by Gérard Philipe, TNP Festival d'Avignon  
1959: La Fête du cordonnier by Michel Vinaver after Thomas Dekker, directed by Georges Wilson, TNP Théâtre de Chaillot
1959: Murder in the Cathedral by Thomas Stearns Eliot, directed by Jean Vilar, TNP Festival d'Avignon
1959: Danton's Death by Georg Büchner, directed by Jean Vilar, TNP Théâtre de Chaillot
1959: Mother Courage by Bertolt Brecht, directed by Jean Vilar, TNP Festival d'Avignon 
1960: Erik XIV by August Strindberg, directed by Jean Vilar, TNP Théâtre de Chaillot, Festival d'Avignon
1960: Mother Courage by Bertolt Brecht, directed by Jean Vilar, TNP Festival d'Avignon
1960: Ubu roi by Alfred Jarry, directed by Jean Vilar, TNP Théâtre de Chaillot
1960: The Resistible Rise of Arturo Ui by Bertolt Brecht, directed by Jean Vilar and Georges Wilson, TNP Théâtre de Chaillot
1960: Antigone by Sophocles, directed by Jean Vilar, Festival d'Avignon
1961: Antigone by Sophocles, directed by Jean Vilar, Festival d'Avignon
1965: La Seconde Surprise de l'amour by Marivaux, directed by Maurice Guillaud, Festival du Marais
1966: The Miser by Molière, directed by Jean Vilar, Festival du Marais Hôtel de Rohan

Filmography

Cinema 

1946: La Foire aux chimères (by Pierre Chenal)
1950: A Certain Mister (by Yves Ciampi)
1950: Lady Paname (by Henri Jeanson) - Bit part (uncredited)
1950: Gunman in the Streets (by Boris Lewin) - (uncredited)
1951: Paris Vice Squad (by Hervé Bromberger) - L'inspecteur qui prend la déposition au début du film (uncredited)
1951: The Strange Madame X (by Jean Grémillon) - Le majordome
1951: Victor (by Claude Heymann) - Le directeur de la banque
1951: La plus belle fille du monde (by Christian Stengel)
1951: My Wife Is Formidable (by André Hunebelle) - Le docteur
1952: We Are All Murderers (by André Cayatte) - Le directeur de la "santé"
1952: Monsieur Taxi (by André Hunebelle) - L'homme accidenté
1952: Le rideau rouge / Ce soir on joue Macbeth (by André Barsac)
1955: Black Dossier (by André Cayatte)
1957: Amour de poche (by Pierre Kast) - Cahuzac
1960: La Millième Fenêtre (by Robert Ménégoz) - (uncredited)
1962: The Devil and the Ten Commandments (by Julien Duvivier) - Le directeur de la banque (segment "Bien d'autrui ne prendras")
1963: OSS 117 se déchaîne (by André Hunebelle)
1963: The Fire Within (by Louis Malle) - Le docteur La Berbinais
1963: La Foire aux cancres (by Louis Daquin) - Le maire
1964: Mort, où est ta victoire ? (by Hervé Bromberger) - Belignat
1964: Monsieur (by Jean-Paul Le Chanois) - Maître Flament, le notaire
1964: Nick Carter va tout casser (by Henri Decoin) - Didier Formentaire
1964: Rien ne va plus (by Jean Bacqué) - Le baron
1964: Behold a Pale Horse (by Fred Zinnemann) - Le père Estéban
1965: Diamonds Are Brittle (by Nicolas Gessner) - Le bijoutier
1966: Lost Command (by Mark Robson) - De Guyot
1966: Sale temps pour les mouches (by Guy Lefranc) - Le général André Pujol
1968: Guns for San Sebastian (by Henri Verneuil)
1968: Tu seras terriblement gentille (by Dirk Sanders) - Le directeur du magasin
1969: Under the Sign of the Bull (by Gilles Grangier) - Pierre, le valet
1970: Une drôle de bourrique / L'âne de Zigliara by Jean Canolle) - L'évêque
1971: Mourir d'aimer (by André Cayatte) - Monsieur Guénot
1973: The Dominici Affair (by Claude Bernard-Aubert) - Le médecin légiste
1974: Impossible Is Not French (by Robert Lamoureux) - De Sica
1976: Mado (by Claude Sautet) - Papa
1983: Les Oiseaux noirs (Svarta Faglar) (by Lasse Glomm) - Le père de Simone (final film role)

Television 

1950: Agence Nostradamus (by Claude Barma)
1959: La Confession (TV Movie) - Ledward
1961: La caméra explore le temps - Le prince de Condé / Le roi Louis-Philippe
1961–1962: Le Théâtre de la jeunesse - Blazius / Gilles
1962: La Belle et son fantôme (by Bernard Hecht) - Walter de Lestrange
1962: Les Cinq Dernières Minutes (by Pierre Nivollet) - Le docteur
1962: L'inspecteur Leclerc enquête (by Jean Laviron) - Marquet
1963: Siegfried (by Marcel Cravenne) - Robineau
1963: Commandant X - Le consul
1964: Rocambole (by Jean-Pierre Decourt) - Lord Charring
1964: Une fille dans la montagne (TV Movie) - Gardin
1964: La montre en or (TV Movie) - Toupin
1965: Le Roi Lear (TV Movie, by Jean Kerchbron) - Le comte de Gloucester
1965: Sens interdit (TV Movie) - Daniel
1965: Merlusse (TV Movie) - Le proviseur
1966: Le Chevalier d'Harmental - Mallézieux
1966: The Miser (TV Movie) - Maître Jacques
1967: Saturnin Belloir (by Jacques-Gérard Cornu) - Saturnin Belloir
1967: Marion Delorme (TV Movie) - La marquis de Mangis
1968: Princesse Czardas (TV Movie) - Le prince
1968: Graf Yoster - Dr. Leander
1969: Le distrait (TV Movie) - Valère
1969: Fortune  (by Henri Colpi) - Docteur Robinson
1970: Monsieur de Pourceaugnac (TV Movie) - Un suisse, Comédie-Française
1971: Si j'étais vous (TV Movie, by Ange Casta) - Oncle Firmin
1972: Ruy Blas (TV Movie) - Marquis de Santa Cruz, Comédie-Française
1972: La Station Champbaudet (TV Movie, Comédie-Française, by Georges Folgoas)
1973: La porteuse de pain - Jules Labroue
1973: L'étang de la Breure - M. de la Cazère
1973: Marie Dorval (TV Movie) - Merle
1973: Molière pour rire et pour pleurer  (TV Movie, by Marcel Camus) - Le chancelier de Lamoignon
1974: Les Faucheurs de marguerites (TV Mini-Series, by Marcel Camus) - M. Perrier
1974: L'implantation (TV Movie) - Paul
1974: Jean Pinot, médecin d'aujourd'hui (by Michel Fermaud) - Dr. Clavé
1975: La médecin malgré lui (TV Movie) - Robert
1977: Madame Ex (TV Movie) - Le père de Louis
1977: Richelieu (by Jean-Pierre Decourt) - Le pape
1977: Lorenzaccio (TV Movie) - Guicciardini, Comédie-Française
1977: Ou vont les poissons rouges? (TV Movie) - Le pêcheur
1978: Ce diable d'homme (TV Mini-Series) - M. Arouet
1978: On ne badine pas avec l'amour (TV Movie) - La paysan, Comédie-Française
1980: L'œuf (TV Movie) - Eugène, Comédie-Française
1980: Julien Fontanes, magistrat - Me Tasille
1980: Jean-Sans-Terre (TV Movie) - Le beau-père
1982: La double inconstance (TV Movie) - Un seigneur, Comédie-Française
1982: Les Caprices de Marianne (TV Movie) - Malvolio
1982: Emmenez-moi au théâtre: Lorsque l'enfant paraît (TV Movie) - M. Jacquet
1982: La démobilisation générale (TV Movie) - Albert Sarraut

Dubbing 
 1960: Ben-Hur: French voice of the narrator.

Bibliography 
 Yvan Foucart: Dictionnaire des comédiens français disparus, Mormoiron : Éditions cinéma, 2008, 1185 p.

External links 
 

20th-century French male actors
Sociétaires of the Comédie-Française
1912 births
People from Nice
1989 deaths